John Westacott (born 9 August 1933) is  a former Australian rules footballer who played with Footscray in the Victorian Football League (VFL).

See also
 Australian football at the 1956 Summer Olympics

Notes

External links 		
		
		
		
		
		
		
Living people		
1933 births		
		
Australian rules footballers from Victoria (Australia)		
Western Bulldogs players
Collegians Football Club players